Yang Min (born 20 February 1963) is a Chinese-Italian table tennis player who represented Italy at the 2004 Summer Olympics.

He won a bronze medal at the 2000 World Team Table Tennis Championships in the Swaythling Cup (men's team event) with Umberto Giardina, Massimiliano Mondello and Valentino Piacentini for Italy.

See also
 List of table tennis players
 List of World Table Tennis Championships medalists

References

1963 births
Living people
Table tennis players from Shanghai
Italian male table tennis players
Italian people of Chinese descent
Chinese emigrants to Italy
Chinese male table tennis players
Table tennis players at the 2004 Summer Olympics
Olympic table tennis players of Italy
Naturalised table tennis players
Mediterranean Games gold medalists for Italy
Mediterranean Games medalists in table tennis
Competitors at the 2005 Mediterranean Games